Tuxedo Stan ( 2010 – September 9, 2013) was a black and white cat who ran for mayor of Halifax, Nova Scotia in the 2012 municipal elections. After the announcement of his candidacy, he achieved international attention and was endorsed by Ellen DeGeneres and Anderson Cooper.

Political campaign
In 2012, a small group of friends created a political party ("The Tuxedo Party of Canada") to raise awareness of the growing feral cat population in Halifax. They created a Facebook group and announced Tuxedo Stan's candidacy for mayor of Halifax, Nova Scotia in the 2012 municipal elections. Although he was unable to formally run because regulations required that candidates have a birth certificate, he quickly gained international attention and drew attention to local Trap–neuter–return efforts.

In the wake of his failed mayoral bid, the Halifax Regional Council voted to give $40,000 to the SPCA for a new vet clinic that will spay and neuter feral cats.

Death
Tuxedo Stan was euthanized by his owners on September 9, 2013 after a battle with terminal cancer.

See also
 List of individual cats

References

External links
 The Tuxedo Party of Canada

2013 animal deaths
Animal welfare
Individual cats in Canada
Joke political parties in Canada